The Bahrain National Holding BSC (BNH) is a public holding company based in Manama. Established in 1969, it operates on all insurance and risk management services. In 1988 the National Insurance Company merged with the Bahrain Insurance Company to become BNH.

Their Website Link : https://www.bnhgroup.com/

Organization 
The company is split into three parts: 
Motor & General insurance (aviation, engineering, marine, motor and property). 
Life insurance and Medical (group credit life, group life, level term assurance, medical products, term assurance decline, and saving scheme plans).
Corporate (administrative and fiscal operations services). 

Bahrain National Insurance Company BSC and Bahrain National Life Assurance Company BSC are company subsidiaries.

History 
In May 2020, BNL acquired the remaining 25 percent equity stake in the Bahrain National Life Assurance Company BSC (BNL). The transaction between Al Khaleej Takaful Insurance Company QPSC and BNH rendered BNL the subsidiary’s total owner. In 2008, Farouk Y. Almoayyed was appointed Chairman of the Board and Abdul Hussein K. Dawani Vice Chairman of the Board. In 2014 Samir I.Al Wazzan became CEO. In total there are 673 employees, generating a sales valued at $75.33m.

Recognition 
In 2012, BNL received the World Finance Insurance Award, the Global Banking Finance Awards in the Best General Insurance Company of Bahrain category in 2015; Performing Insurance Company – Middle East Life Insurance Award in 2016. In 2017 it received Standard and Poor’s  “BBB+” rating along with a stable.

References 

Holding companies of Bahrain
Holding companies established in 1969
Bahraini companies established in 1969